Renate Wagner-Rieger (January 10, 1921 – December 11, 1980, her maiden name is Renate Rieger) was an Austrian art historian and educator, with significant research in the fields of architecture and historicism.

Education and career
Renate Rieger was born January 10, 1921, in Vienna. In 1942 she studied art history at the University of Vienna, under Hans Sedlmayr and Karl Oettinger and received her PhD in 1947 under Karl Maria Swoboda on the architectural facade of the Viennese apartments from the 16th to the mid-18th century. In 1956 she became a lecturer at University of Vienna and in the same year married historian Walter Wagner.

In 1964 she presented to the International Congress of Art History in Bonn her research on early gothic architecture in Italy and a paper on historicism which brought her to international attention.

In 1971 Renate Wagner-Rieger was appointed full professor at University of Vienna, she was the first woman in the history department to hold this position.

Wagner-Rieger paid particular attention to previously neglected and partially devalued era of Historicism in architecture (the breakdown in romantic historicism, strict historicism and late historicism stems from it) and important contributions towards the study of Gründerzeit. In 1968 she initiated the large-scale research project called "Wiener Ringstraße", also known as "The Ringstraße: Image of an Era: the expansion of the inner city of Vienna under Emperor Franz Joseph" which studied the ring road in the historic center of Vienna.

Renate Wagner-Rieger died in Vienna, after a brief illness a few weeks before her 60th birthday on December 11, 1980.

Publications 
 
 Wagner-Rieger, Renate (1957) "The Vienna townhouse Baroque and Classicism"
 Wagner-Rieger, Renate (1962) "The lock to Spittal an der Drau in Carinthia"
 
 Wagner-Rieger, Renate (1970) "Vienna's architecture in the 19th century"

Literature

Awards and honors 

 1976: Prize of the City of Vienna for the Humanities (Preis der Stadt Wien für Geisteswissenschaften)
1998: Wagner-Rieger-Tor, passage from courtyard 8 to courtyard 9, within the “Gates of Remembrance” on the campus of the University of Vienna

References

Austrian art historians
1921 births
1980 deaths
Austrian women academics
University of Vienna alumni
Academic staff of the University of Vienna
Women art historians
20th-century Austrian historians
20th-century women writers